The eastern mogurnda (Mogurnda orientalis) is a species of fish in the family Eleotridae endemic to Papua New Guinea, where it is only known to occur in deep pools around Safia.

References

Mogurnda
Freshwater fish of Papua New Guinea
Fish described in 1991
Taxonomy articles created by Polbot